Leptopetalum biflorum, synonym Hedyotis biflora, is a species of flowering plant in the family Rubiaceae.

Description 
Leptopetalum biflorum is an annual or perennial plant measuring up to 15–30 cm in height.

References 

Spermacoceae